This list of intelligence and espionage-related awards and decorations is an index to articles about notable awards and decorations related to intelligence and espionage.

General

 R. V. Jones Intelligence Award: Created by the CIA in 1993 to honour those whose accomplishments mirror in substance and style those of Reginald Victor Jones, to wit: "Scientific acumen applied with art in the cause of freedom"
 Awards and emblems of the Ministry of Defence of the Russian Federation
For Service in Military Intelligence
For Service in Military Intelligence in Airborne Troops
Excellent in Military Intelligence
 Sam Adams Award. Awarded by the Sam Adams Associates for Integrity in Intelligence to an intelligence professional who has taken a stand for integrity and ethics.
 South African intelligence service decorations: Various awards

United States Intelligence Community

The United States Intelligence Community is a group of separate United States government intelligence agencies and subordinate organizations, that work separately and together to conduct intelligence activities to support the foreign policy and national security of the United States.

Central Intelligence Agency

The Central Intelligence Agency (CIA) is a civilian foreign intelligence service of the federal government of the United States, tasked with gathering, processing, and analyzing national security information from around the world, primarily through the use of human intelligence (HUMINT)

See also

 Lists of awards

References